Carlos Alberto Babington (born 20 September 1949) is an Argentine former football attacking midfielder. He represented the Argentina national team at the 1974 World Cup.

Biography

Babington (nicknamed "El Inglés" – The Englishman) was born in Buenos Aires. His grandfather was Colville Burroughs Babington, who moved to Argentina and married Laureana Carro in 1889. His great-grandfather, Colville, was the grandson of Benjamin Guy Babington and great-grandson of William Babington who has a statue in St. Paul's Cathedral.

He started his career as footballer at Club Atlético Huracán in 1969. With Huracán, Babington was part of the team that won the 1973 Metropolitano. Managed by César Menotti, that squad is widely regarded as one of the best Argentine teams ever, with Babington being a key player along with René Houseman, Miguel Brindisi and Omar Larrosa.

In 1974, he was transferred to the German team SG Wattenscheid 09, though he had also considered an offer from Stoke City due to his English ancestry.

Babington returned to Huracán in 1979 and played for the club until 1982, when he moved to Florida, United States, to play for the Tampa Bay Rowdies. In 1983, he played for Atlético Junior of Barranquilla, Colombia where he ended his career due to personal matters. He retired from football later that year.

Babington scored 126 goals for Huracán in his eight years with the club.

Managerial career
As manager, he coached Platense, Banfield, Racing, River Plate, León Fútbol Club (Mexico), Chacarita Juniors and Huracán. As Huracán manager, he won two Second Division champinsohips in 1990 and 2000, helping Huracán to return to Primera División.

In 2006 Babington was elected as Huracán's president. Under his administration, the team achieved another promotion to Primera División, remaining in the top division until the 2010–11 season when Huracán would be relegated again.

Babington and Daniel Passarella (of River Plate) are the only people to have been player, manager and president of a single football club in Argentina.

Honours

Player
Huracán
 Primera División (1): 1973 Metropolitano

Manager
Huracán
 Primera B Nacional (2): 1989–90, 1999–00

References

External links

 NASL stats
  

1949 births
Living people
1974 FIFA World Cup players
Argentina international footballers
Argentine expatriate footballers
Argentine expatriate sportspeople in Germany
Argentine expatriate sportspeople in the United States
Argentine footballers
Association football midfielders
Association football forwards
Expatriate footballers in Germany
Expatriate soccer players in the United States
Club Atlético Huracán footballers
Argentine Primera División players
North American Soccer League (1968–1984) players
2. Bundesliga players
Footballers from Buenos Aires
SG Wattenscheid 09 players
Tampa Bay Rowdies (1975–1993) players
Club Atlético Huracán managers
Club Atlético River Plate managers
Club León managers
Argentine football managers
Argentine people of English descent
Argentine people of Irish descent